Strachota (Czech feminine: Strachotová) is a surname. Notable people with the surname include:

 Franz Strachota (1918–2009), Austrian field hockey player
 Grażyna Strachota (born 1960), Polish actress
 Patricia Strachota (born 1955), American politician

See also
 

Czech-language surnames
Polish-language surnames